Justice Kimball may refer to:

Catherine D. Kimball, chief justice of the Louisiana Supreme Court
Ralph Kimball (judge), associate justice of the Wyoming Supreme Court